Let's Talk About Love / Falling into You / A New Day Has Come is a 3 CD box set by Canadian singer Celine Dion, released on 29 October 2007. It was re-released as The Collection on 29 September 2009 and Original Album Classics on 26 July 2010.

Content
It contains three best-selling Dion albums: Let's Talk About Love, Falling into You and A New Day Has Come, in an exclusive deluxe package. It is presented in a digipak picture sleeve complete with a 16-page picture booklet. The box set includes track list from the US versions of Let's Talk About Love, Falling into You and A New Day Has Come.

Commercial performance
At first, Let's Talk About Love / Falling into You / A New Day Has Come entered the charts in Canada and Belgium in November 2007. It reached number 97 on the Canadian Albums Chart and number twenty on the Belgian Ultratop Wallonia Mid Price Albums. In May 2008, Let's Talk About Love / Falling into You / A New Day Has Come debuted on the charts in the United Kingdom and Sweden. It peaked at number 106 on the UK Albums Chart and number 95 on the Scottish Albums Chart. In Sweden, the album reached number three and was certified Gold for selling 20,000 copies. It also became 41-st best-selling album in Sweden in 2008. Thanks to the success in Sweden, Let's Talk About Love / Falling into You / A New Day Has Come also entered the European Top 100 Albums and peaked at number 74 there. In April 2010, it also charted on the Norwegian Mid Price Albums Chart, reaching number five.

Track listing

Charts

Weekly charts

Year-end charts

Certifications and sales

Release history

References

External links
 

2007 compilation albums
Albums produced by Aldo Nova
Albums produced by Christopher Neil
Albums produced by David Foster
Albums produced by Guy Roche
Albums produced by Humberto Gatica
Albums produced by Jim Steinman
Albums produced by John Jones (record producer)
Albums produced by Rick Nowels
Albums produced by Ric Wake
Albums produced by Robert John "Mutt" Lange
Albums produced by Roy Bittan
Albums produced by Steven Rinkoff
Albums produced by Walter Afanasieff
Celine Dion compilation albums